Linxiang District is a district of the city of Lincang, Yunnan province, China.

Administrative divisions
Linxiang District has 2 subdistricts, 1 town, 5 townships and 2 ethnic townships. 
2 subdistricts
 Fengxiang
 Mangpan
1 town
 Boshang
5 townships

2 ethnic townships
 Nanmei Lahu
 Pingcun Yi and Dai

Transportation
Lincang Airport is located here, as is Lincang railway station, the southern terminus of the Dali–Lincang railway.

References

External links
Linxiang District Official Website

County-level divisions of Lincang